Alexander Ponton (6 February 1898 – 31 October 1949) was a Canadian sprinter. He competed in the men's 100 metres at the 1920 Summer Olympics.

References

External links
 

1898 births
1949 deaths
Athletes (track and field) at the 1920 Summer Olympics
Canadian male sprinters
Olympic track and field athletes of Canada
Sportspeople from Edinburgh
Scottish emigrants to Canada